Sune Andersson may refer to:

Sune Andersson (footballer, born 1921) (1921–2002), Swedish footballer
Sune Andersson (footballer, born 1898) (1898–1981), Swedish footballer
Sune Andersson (Malmö FF footballer), Swedish footballer

Fictional characters
Sune Andersson, the protagonist of the book series Sune